Burns Chuckwagon From the Stampede Corral is a Canadian variety television series which aired on CBC Television from 1954 to 1955.

Premise
This Vancouver-produced western-themed series frequently featured musical artists such as Lorraine McAllister, Don Francks, Pat Kirkpatrick and Arnie Nelson. Comedian Barney Potts also made regular appearances, as did instrumental band The Rhythm Pals. Guests such as George Colangis (mandolin) and Wallie Peters (banjo) were sometimes seen on the series.

Scheduling
This half-hour series was broadcast Wednesdays at 10:30 p.m. (Eastern) from 3 November 1954 to 29 June 1955.

External links
 
 

CBC Television original programming
1954 Canadian television series debuts
1955 Canadian television series endings
1950s Canadian variety television series
Black-and-white Canadian television shows
Television shows filmed in Vancouver